William Gamiel Perkins (June 26, 1906 – January 24, 1958) was an American baseball catcher from  who played in the Negro leagues from 1928 to 1948 with several teams.

A native of Albany, Georgia, Perkins is best known for being "Satchel Paige's personal catcher throughout his career" and wearing a chest protector that read, "Thou shalt not steal!" While playing for the Pittsburgh Crawfords, Perkins served as Josh Gibson's backup catcher; but, even as backup catcher, he was the one to whom Paige most often threw his fastballs. He played in two East-West All-Star Games, in 1934 and 1940.

Perkins was one of the "jumpers" who jumped to Santo Domingo when tropical countries started summer seasons in competition with American leagues. He was temporarily suspended from playing in the United States in 1938, but the suspension was short and he then signed with the Philadelphia Stars. He served in the US Army during World War II, and was shot in a restaurant in 1948 with very limited details about the event.

References

External links

 and Baseball-Reference Black Baseball stats and Seamheads
Negro Leagues Baseball Museum

1906 births
1958 deaths
Baltimore Black Sox players
Brooklyn Royal Giants players
Birmingham Black Barons players
Cleveland Cubs players
Pittsburgh Crawfords players
Homestead Grays players
Baltimore Elite Giants players
New York Black Yankees players
Philadelphia Stars players
Baseball players from Massachusetts
20th-century African-American sportspeople
Baseball catchers